Wuhan University Library is the library system of Wuhan University, serving the university's students and faculty. It has 4 branches:  Arts and Sciences Library, Engineering Library, Information Technology Library and Medical Library. The collection contains approximately 228,000 books & periodicals, 5,778 newspapers, 6,767,000 printing volumes, 6,590,000 e-books & e-magazines, 442 databases and 200,000 volumes of thread-bound ancient books as of 2011.

History 
The predecessor of the Wuhan University Library was the Zi Qiang School founded by Zhang Zhidong. In 1913, the National Wuchang Higher Normal College was founded, containing a small library. The library first appears in formal documents in 1917. In 1927, the library changed its name to the National Wuhan University Library. At first there was only one book cataloger, about 3000 foreign language books, and a small number of Chinese books. In 1936 the collection grew to about 140,000 books. From 1928 to 1936, Yang Mingzhi, Pi Zongshi and Yang Duanliu successively served as its director. The old library building on the top of Mount Shizi was built in 1935.

During the second Sino-Japanese War, the library moved to Leshan, Sichuan. During the bombing in Leshan on August 19, 1939, and the plundering of books by the Japanese on March 4, 1940, many volumes were lost, and the library collection dropped to less than 100,000 volumes. It then served as an institution to preserve books, and did not allow people to borrow them. When the library returned to Luojia Hill after the war, the collection grew to 154,455 volumes.

After the war, the library having received a large donation amount from the United Kingdom and the United States, the foreign language resources increased. In 1947, some left-wing students formed a new library called June 1 Library, the collections of which were merged into the University Library after 1949.
In 2000, Wuhan University Library and its surrounding buildings were listed in the Fifth Major Historical and Cultural Site Protected at the National Level batch.

Wuhan University Library values its geomatic book collections as its basic development orientation and maintains the most integrated geomatics global periodicals, foreign meeting proceedings, numerous scale relief maps and distant sensing picture photographs. The library is known especially for the foreign periodical collection, in which it has over 2700 global periodical headings, covering the earliest volumes of German technical journal Zeitschrift für Vermessungswesen, complete from the initial volume in 1873 to the present.

References 

1917 establishments in China
Academic libraries in China
Libraries in Wuhan
Wuhan University
Libraries established in 1917